Rodoljub "Rođa" Marjanović (born 27 January 1988) is a Serbian professional footballer who plays as a forward. He also holds Croatian citizenship.

Despite his talent, Marjanović never managed to reach his full potential due to the lack of professionalism. He is, however, probably best known for being recognized by FIFPro's Black Book Eastern Europe after allegedly being threatened with death for asking the Football Association of Serbia (FSS) to take action for unpaid salaries during a loan spell at Hajduk Kula.

Early life
Born in Osijek (in present-day Croatia), Marjanović spent the majority of his childhood in nearby Beli Manastir. He moved to Sombor (in present-day Vojvodina, an autonomous province of Serbia) with his family in 1997, subsequently joining the youth ranks of local club Radnički. He also played for Mladost Apatin and Partizan at youth level.

Club career
While completing his formation at Rad, Marjanović made his senior debut in the second half of the 2004–05 Serbian Second League. He spent two more seasons with the Građevinari, before transferring to OFK Beograd in August 2007, signing a four-year contract. Subsequently, Marjanović played for the Romantičari over the next two seasons, before being loaned to Radnički Sombor (2009) and Hajduk Kula (2010).

Despite skipping training sessions during the later part of his loan spell, Marjanović was signed by Hajduk Kula on a permanent basis in the summer of 2010. He eventually gained wide media attention in early 2011, following disputes with the club's board. Later that year, Marjanović rejoined his former club Radnički Sombor.

In March 2012, Marjanović moved abroad and joined Romanian club CSMS Iași. He played seven games and scored four goals in Liga II, helping the club earn promotion to the top flight. After a brief third spell at Radnički Sombor in late 2012, Marjanović signed with Montenegrin First League club Čelik Nikšić in January 2013.

In August 2013, Marjanović returned to Serbia and signed for Serbian First League side Inđija. He subsequently made another return to Radnički Sombor in the 2014 winter transfer window. In July 2015, Marjanović moved to Sweden and joined FC Gute on a short-term contract. He later signed with fellow Swedish side Dalhem IF in March 2016.

International career
A former Serbia and Montenegro U17 international, Marjanović represented Serbia at the 2007 UEFA European Under-19 Championship.

Statistics

Notes

References

External links
 
 
 
 

Association football forwards
Expatriate footballers in Montenegro
Expatriate footballers in Romania
Expatriate footballers in Sweden
FC Gute players
FC Politehnica Iași (2010) players
First League of Serbia and Montenegro players
FK Čelik Nikšić players
FK Hajduk Kula players
FK Inđija players
FK Rad players
FK Radnički Sombor players
Liga II players
Montenegrin First League players
OFK Beograd players
Serbia and Montenegro footballers
Serbia youth international footballers
Serbian expatriate footballers
Serbian expatriate sportspeople in Montenegro
Serbian expatriate sportspeople in Romania
Serbian expatriate sportspeople in Sweden
Serbian First League players
Serbian footballers
Serbian SuperLiga players
Serbs of Croatia
Sportspeople from Osijek
1988 births
Living people